The 24th Congress of the Communist Party of the Soviet Union (CPSU) was convened in Moscow from 30 March to 9 April 1971.  The Congress brought together 4,963 delegates, with 102 foreign delegations from 91 countries as observers.

The Congress agenda consisted of:
 The Report of the CPSU Central Committee delivered by General Secretary Leonid Brezhnev.
 The Report on the Directives for the Five-Year Economic Development Plan of the USSR for 1971-1975 delivered by A. Kosygin, Chairman of the USSR Council of Ministers.
 Elections of central Party organs.

The 24th Congress was to have authorized implementation of Victor Glushkov's OGAS information network plan, but ultimately endorsed only expansion of local information management systems.

References

External links
24th Congress of the Communist Party of the Soviet Union, containing major speeches and documents
Voices of Tomorrow: The 24th Congress of the Communist Party of the Soviet Union

Communist Party of the Soviet Union 24
1971 in the Soviet Union
1971 conferences
April 1971 events in Europe